William Collins (February 22, 1818 – June 18, 1878) was an American lawyer and politician who served one term as a United States representative from New York from 1847 to 1849.

Biography 
Collins was born in Lowville on February 22, 1818, and was the son of Congressman Ela Collins and Maria Clinton Collins.

Congress 
He studied law with his father, was admitted to the bar and commenced practice in Lowville.  He served as district attorney for Lewis County from March 1845 until March 1847, when he resigned because he had been elected as a Democrat to the Thirtieth Congress (March 4, 1847 – March 3, 1849).  He declined to be a candidate for renomination in 1848.

In November 1847, William Collins married Jane Kelley; they had seven children.

Later career and death 
Collins moved to Cleveland, Ohio in 1853 and continued the practice of law, and also engaged in banking and business.  He served as a director of the Lake Shore Railroad and East Cleveland Railroad.  He affiliated with the Republican Party upon its organization in 1856, and died in Cleveland on June 18, 1878.  His interment was in Lake View Cemetery.

References

Sources
 

1818 births
1878 deaths
Politicians from Cleveland
Burials at Lake View Cemetery, Cleveland
Ohio Republicans
Democratic Party members of the United States House of Representatives from New York (state)
19th-century American politicians
Members of the United States House of Representatives from New York (state)